Alene Lee (1931–1991) was an African-American member of the Beat generation in New York City whose romantic relationship with Jack Kerouac was the central theme in his novel The Subterraneans. Kerouac used the pseudonym Mardou Fox for Lee. Lee was also the model for the character of Irene May in Book of Dreams and Big Sur.
Lee shunned publicity, but her daughter has written about her life.

References

1931 births
1991 deaths
Beat Generation writers